Gongylosoma is a genus of snakes of the superfamily Colubroidea.

Species
 Gongylosoma baliodeira (Boie, 1827)
 Gongylosoma longicauda (Peters, 1871)
 Gongylosoma mukutense Grismer, Das & Leong, 2003
 Gongylosoma nicobariensis (Stoliczka, 1870)
 Gongylosoma scriptum (Theobald, 1868)

References

Gongylosoma
Snake genera